The Barbuda People's Movement for Change is a political party in Barbuda, part of Antigua and Barbuda.

At their last elections, 23 March 2004, the party contested the sole seat allotted to Barbuda (in total there are 17 seats in the parliament). The election ended in a draw between BPMC and the Barbuda People's Movement, which both got exactly 400 votes. A by-election was held on April 20 in which Trevor Walker of BPM was elected with 408 votes against 394 for the BPMC candidate Arthur Nibbs.

Ahead of the elections former BPMC general secretary, Ordrick Samuel had launched a new party, Barbudans for a Better Barbuda.

BPMC is allied to the Antigua Labour Party.

Electoral results

House of Representatives

Barbuda Council

References

Political parties in Antigua and Barbuda
Barbuda political parties
Political parties with year of establishment missing
Political parties with year of disestablishment missing